The 1980–81 Primeira Divisão was the 47th season of top-tier football in Portugal.

Overview
It was contested by 16 teams, and S.L. Benfica won the championship.

League standings

Results

Season statistics

Top goalscorers

References

External links
 Portugal 1980-81 - RSSSF (Jorge Miguel Teixeira)
 Portuguese League 1980/81 - footballzz.co.uk
 Portugal - Table of Honor - Soccer Library 

Primeira Liga seasons
1980–81 in Portuguese football
Portugal